Terniopsis is a genus of flowering plants belonging to the family Podostemaceae.

Its native range is Thailand, Laos and Hainan.

Species:

Terniopsis brevis 
Terniopsis chanthaburiensis 
Terniopsis daoyinensis 
Terniopsis filiformis 
Terniopsis heterostaminata 
Terniopsis microstigma 
Terniopsis minor 
Terniopsis ramosa 
Terniopsis savannaketensis 
Terniopsis sesadensis 
Terniopsis ubonensis 
Terniopsis vapyensis

References

Podostemaceae
Malpighiales genera